Gjorgji Todorovski  (born 19 February 1955) is a Macedonian football manager and former professional football player.

Playing career

Club
As a player, he played youth football for FK Vardar where he made his senior debut in 1974. He played over 200 games for FK Vardar in the Yugoslav First League. He also played for Preston Makedonia in the Australian National Soccer League recently known as the A-League

Managerial career
As an assistant coach, in 2006 he won the Macedonian Cup with Makedonija Gjorce Petrov. In the following years he was the head coach at FK Vardar, FK Horizont Turnovo and FK Teteks

In 2011 he qualified for the UEFA Pro Licence

Honours
FK Makedonija Gorce Petrov
Macedonian Football Cup: 2005–06

Notes

References

1955 births
Living people
Footballers from Belgrade
Association football defenders
Macedonian footballers
Yugoslav footballers
FK Vardar players
Preston Lions FC players
FK Teteks players
Yugoslav First League players
Yugoslav Second League players
National Soccer League (Australia) players
Yugoslav expatriate footballers
Macedonian expatriate footballers
Expatriate soccer players in Australia
Yugoslav expatriate sportspeople in Australia
Macedonian expatriate sportspeople in Australia
Macedonian football managers
FK Makedonija Gjorče Petrov managers
FK Vardar managers
FK Horizont Turnovo managers
FK Teteks managers